Jacob Karlzon (born 19 October 1970 in Jönköping, Sweden) is a Swedish musician, pianist, composer and accompanist. He has often performed with singer Viktoria Tolstoy.

Discography

References

External links

Living people
1970 births
21st-century pianists